The 1990 CCHA Men's Ice Hockey Tournament was the 19th CCHA Men's Ice Hockey Tournament. It was played between March 2 and March 10, 1990. First round games were played at campus sites, while 'final four' games were played at Joe Louis Arena in Detroit, Michigan. By winning the tournament, Michigan State received the Central Collegiate Hockey Association's automatic bid to the 1990 NCAA Division I Men's Ice Hockey Tournament.

Format
The tournament featured three rounds of play. The team that finished below eighth place in the standings was not eligible for postseason play. In the quarterfinals, the first and eighth seeds, the second and seventh seeds, the third seed and sixth seeds and the fourth seed and fifth seeds played a best-of-three series, with the winners advancing to the semifinals. In the semifinals, the remaining highest and lowest seeds and second highest and second lowest seeds play a single-game, with the winners advancing to the finals. The tournament champion receives an automatic bid to the 1990 NCAA Division I Men's Ice Hockey Tournament.

Conference standings
Note: GP = Games played; W = Wins; L = Losses; T = Ties; PTS = Points; GF = Goals For; GA = Goals Against

Bracket

Note: * denotes overtime period(s)

First round

(1) Michigan State vs. (8) Ferris State

(2) Lake Superior State vs. (7) Miami

(3) Bowling Green vs. (6) Ohio State

(4) Michigan vs. (5) Western Michigan

Semifinals

(1) Michigan State vs. (4) Michigan

(2) Lake Superior State vs. (3) Bowling Green

Consolation Game

(3) Bowling Green vs. (4) Michigan

Championship

(1) Michigan State vs. (2) Lake Superior State

Tournament awards

All-Tournament Team
F Mark Ouimet (Michigan)
F Jeff Jablonski (Lake Superior State)
F Peter White* (Michigan State)
D Kord Cernich (Lake Superior State)
D Rob Blake (Bowling Green)
G Jason Muzzatti (Michigan State)
* Most Valuable Player(s)

References

External links
CCHA Champions
1989–90 CCHA Standings
1989–90 NCAA Standings

CCHA Men's Ice Hockey Tournament
Ccha tournament